The 2012 Hungarian Athletics Championships were the 117th edition of the Hungarian Athletics Championships, which took place on 16–17 June 2012 at the Városi Szabadidőközpont in Szekszárd. The competition was organized in remembrance of Ágoston Schulek, a multiple Hungarian champion in pole vault as an active and the president of the Hungarian Athletics Association after his retirement, who died in October 2011.

Qualification
Initially, Hungarian athletes who met the qualification standard in each specific event might have taken part at the championships, however, the qualification method was later changed. By the new rules, a limit of competitors was set in each event, that allowed only the highest ranked athletes to participate. In addition, foreign athletes who produced in the calendar year an at least 1000 points performance according to the IAAF Scoring Tables were also eligible for participation. Their achievements, however, did not count toward the official results.

The entry limit for the events were the following:

Schedule

Day 1

Day 2

Results

Men

Women

Notes

References

External links
Official website of the Hungarian Athletics Association
 2011 IAAF Scoring Tables of Athletics
Entry list

2012
Hungarian Athletics Championships
Hungarian Athletics Championships